The Zesiini are a small tribe of butterflies in the family Lycaenidae.

Genera
As not all Theclinae have been assigned to tribes, the following list of genera is preliminary:

 Jalmenus
 Pseudalmenus
 Zesius

References

Theclinae
Butterfly tribes